Pierce Run is a  long 2nd order tributary to Buffalo Creek in Brooke County, West Virginia.

Variant names
According to the Geographic Names Information System, it has also been known historically as:
Pierces Run

Course
Pierce Run rises in Franklin, West Virginia, and then flows south and southwest to join Buffalo Creek about 0.25 miles southeast of McKinleyville.

Watershed
Pierce Run drains  of area, receives about 40.1 in/year of precipitation, has a wetness index of 299.07, and is about 74% forested.

See also
List of rivers of West Virginia

References

Rivers of West Virginia
Rivers of Brooke County, West Virginia